The term Important Cultural Property may refer to:
 Important Intangible Cultural Properties of South Korea
 Important Intangible Cultural Properties of Japan